Eccellenza Lombardy is the regional Eccellenza football division for clubs in Lombardy, Italy. It is competed amongst 48 teams, in three groups (A, B and C). The winners of the Groups are promoted to Serie D. The club which finishes second also has the chance to gain promotion, they are entered into a national play-off which consists of two rounds.

Champions
Here are the past champions of the Lombardy Eccellenza, organised into their respective group.

Group A

1991–92 Gallaratese
1992–93 Real Cesate
1993–94 Pro Patria
1994–95 Corbetta
1995–96 Oggiono
1996–97 Cantalupo
1997–98 Oggiono
1998–99 Bellusco
1999–2000 Seregno
2000–01 Vigevano	
2001–02 Robbio
2002–03 Solbiatese
2003–04 Caratese	
2004–05 Fanfulla
2005–06 S.V.Turate
2006–07 Sestese
2007–08 Casteggio Broni
2008–09 Vigevano
2009–10 Saronno
2010–11 Naviglio Trezzano
2011–12 Pro Sesto
2012–13 Inveruno
2013–14 OltrepoVoghera
2014–15 Bustese
2015–16 Varese
2016–17 Arconatese
2017–18 Cavenago Fanfulla
2018–19 Castellanzese
2019–20 Busto 81
2020–21 Olginatese
2021–22 Varesina

Group B

1991–92 Capriolo
1992–93 Chiari
1993–94 Crema
1994–95 Pontisola	
1995–96 Clusone A.Ser.			
1996–97 Corbetta
1997–98 Sancolombano	
1998–99 Pavia
1999–2000 Bergamasca
2000–01 Olginatese
2001–02 Canzese
2002–03 Città di Lecco
2003–04 Fiorente BG
2004–05 Renate 			
2005–06 Merate
2006–07 Caratese
2007–08 AlzanoCene
2008–09 Pontisola
2009–10 Seregno
2010–11 Mapello
2011–12 Caravaggio
2012–13 Giana Erminio
2013–14 Ciserano
2014–15 Alzano Cene
2015–16 Scanzorosciate
2016–17 Crema
2017–18 Sondrio
2018–19 NibionnOggiono
2019–20 Casatese
2020–21 Alcione Milano
2021–22 Sant'Angelo

Group C

1991–92 Cassano 1966
1992–93 Broni
1993–94 Romanese
1994–95 Sancolombano
1995–96 Trevigliese
1996–97 Bagnolese
1997–98 Romanese
1998–99 Pizzighettone
1999–2000 Frassati
2000–01 Palazzolo			
2001–02 Cremapergo
2002–03 Nuova Albano
2003–04 Salò
2004–05 Castellana
2005–06 Darfo Boario	
2006–07 Feralpi Lonato
2007–08 Nuova Verolese
2008–09 Pedrengo
2009–10 Rudianese
2010–11 Aurora Seriate	
2011–12 Sant'Angelo
2012–13 Palazzolo
2013–14 Ciliverghe Mazzano
2014–15 Grumellese
2015–16 Darfo Boario
2016–17 Rezzato
2017–18 Adrense
2018–19 Brusaporto
2019–20 Telgate
2020–21 Leon Monza Brianza
2021–22 Lumezzane

References

External links
Some Club Histories In the League

Sport in Lombardy
Lom
Sports leagues established in 1991
1991 establishments in Italy
Football clubs in Italy
Association football clubs established in 1991